Penmaen may refer to one of several places in Wales:

Penmaen, Caerphilly
 Penmaen, Conwy, a township within the ancient parish of Llysfaen
Penmaen, Swansea

See also:
Penmaenmawr, Conwy County Borough